18 km is a rural locality (a settlement) in Vokhtozhskoye Urban Settlement of Gryazovetsky District, Russia. The population was 5 as of 2010.

Geography 
The settlement is located on the bank of the Monza River, 79 km east of Gryazovets (the district's administrative centre) by road. Monza is the nearest rural locality.

Streets 
There are no streets with titles.

References 

Rural localities in Gryazovetsky District